John Lyons (born 11 July 1949) is a Labour Party politician in the United Kingdom.

At the 2001 general election, he was elected to the House of Commons as the Member of Parliament for Strathkelvin and Bearsden.

Following the reduction in Scottish constituencies in the House of Commons under the Scotland Act 1998, that constituency was abolished for the 2005 general election. Lyons stood at the new East Dunbartonshire seat, where he lost to the future Liberal Democrat leader, Jo Swinson.

Following his defeat, he became a consultant on trade unions for FirstGroup.

Before his election to Parliament in 2001, he had worked as a UNISON official.

Lyons consistently voted against and opposed the invasion of Iraq in 2003.

References

1949 births
Living people
Labour Party (UK) MPs for English constituencies
UK MPs 2001–2005
British trade unionists